Matsu Beigan Airport  is one of the airports in Matsu Islands, Lienchiang County, Fukien Province, Taiwan (ROC). It also serves as a heliport and located on Beigan Island. It is served by Uni Air ATR 72-600 (立榮航空) with scheduled flights to Taipei Songshan Airport.

History

The airport was built in 1994 on the Beigan Island of the Beigan Township.

Airlines and destinations

Accidents and incidents
 On 10 August 1997, Formosa Airlines Flight 7601 crashed while attempting to land at Matsu Beigan Airport. All 16 passengers and crew perished in the accident.

See also
 Civil Aeronautics Administration (Taiwan)
 Transportation in Taiwan
 List of airports in Taiwan

References

External links

Basic information of the airport (in Traditional Chinese)
Basic information of the airport on CAA website (in Traditional Chinese)

1994 establishments in Taiwan
Airports established in 1994
Airports in Lienchiang County
Beigan Township